Oliver Stevenson Ross (born September 18, 1949) is a former professional American football running back who played in the National Football League (NFL). He played for the Denver Broncos (1973–1975) and the Seattle Seahawks (1976).

External links
NFL.com player page

1949 births
Living people
Players of American football from Gainesville, Florida
American football running backs
Alabama A&M Bulldogs football players
Denver Broncos players
Seattle Seahawks players